Rangaswamy Dhruvanarayana (31 July 1961 – 11 March 2023) was an Indian politician and  member of Parliament of Lok Sabha. He was a member of the 15th and 16th Lok Sabha of India. He represented the Chamarajanagar constituency of Karnataka and was a member of the Indian National Congress.

Political career 
Rangaswamy Dhruvanarayana started his political journey as a student leader. In 1983, he joined the Congress as a party worker. In 1984, he held the position of president of the students’ union of Agriculture College, Hebbal, Bangalore. In the same year, he was also president of the National Students Union of India, Bangalore City. In 1986, he went on to serve as general secretary of the Karnataka State Youth Congress.

In 1999, he contested his first Vidhan Sabha elections from Santhermarahalli Constituency, which he lost. In 2004, he contested from the same constituency and won by a margin of a single vote defeating JD (secular) candidate A.R. Krishnamurthy. In 2008, he contested the Vidhan Sabha elections from Kollegal constituency and won by a margin of 11,800 votes. Subsequently, he was elected to the 15th Lok Sabha from Chamarajanagara constituency with a margin of 4,020 votes. Once again in 2014, he was elected to the 16th Lok Sabha as member of Parliament with a margin of 141,182 votes. In 2019, Dhruvanarayan lost to Srinivasa Prasad in the 17th Lok Sabha elections by 12,716 votes.

Election results

References

1961 births
2023 deaths
India MPs 1996–1997
Indian National Congress politicians from Karnataka
Lok Sabha members from Karnataka
India MPs 2009–2014
India MPs 2014–2019
People from Chamarajanagar district
Karnataka MLAs 2008–2013